On 16 September 2016, a bombing in a mosque left 36 people dead and 34 injured. The bombing comes only a few days after another one that killed at least 14 people and wounded 60.

See also
 List of Islamist terrorist attacks
 8 August 2013 Quetta bombing
 January 2016 Quetta suicide bombing
 List of terrorist incidents in September 2016
 Terrorist incidents in Pakistan in 2016
 August 2016 Quetta attacks

References

21st-century mass murder in Pakistan
September 2016 crimes in Asia
Jamaat-ul-Ahrar attacks
Mass murder in 2016
Mass murder in Pakistan
Suicide bombings in Pakistan
Terrorist incidents in Pakistan in 2016
2016 murders in Pakistan